Burleigh is a rural locality in the Shire of Richmond, Queensland, Australia.

Geography 
The Flinders River forms the southern boundary of the locality.

The land use is predominantly cattle grazing.

The Richmond–Croydon Road runs through from south to north-west.

References 

Shire of Richmond
Localities in Queensland